2023 Adelaide International may refer to:

2023 Adelaide International 1, an ATP 250 and WTA 500 tournament in week one of 2023
2023 Adelaide International 2, an ATP 250 and WTA 500 tournament in week two of 2023